Kenji Tohira (Shinjitai: 都平 健二, born 15 February 1941, in Ibaraki) is a Japanese former racing driver.

Racing record

Complete Spa 24 Hour results

Complete Japanese Touring Car Championship (-1993) results

Complete JGTC Results

References 

1941 births
Living people
Japanese racing drivers